A  (plural , German for "fellow traveller") is a person (the German term has the male grammatical gender; to specifically indicate a female the -in suffix has to be added) believed to be tied to or passively sympathising of certain social movements, often to those that are prevalent, controversial or radical. In English, the term was most commonly used after World War II, during the denazification hearings in West Germany, to refer to people who were not charged with Nazi crimes but whose involvement with the Nazi Party was considered so significant that they could not be exonerated for the crimes of the Nazi regime.

Etymology
The German word  (literally "with-walker" or "one walking with") has been in common use since the 17th century. It means as much as "follower", more literally "tag-along", a person who gives in to peer pressure. A  is one who is not convinced by the ideology of the group followed but merely offers no resistance, such as for lack of courage or for opportunism.

The term is usually translated in English as "fellow traveller" or "hanger-on", but it is not equivalent to either. A German dictionary provides the English translation as "follower". An English version dictionary defines it as "a passive follower".

The German word  is derived from it. For example, voters would like to be on the winning side and so prefer to choose the candidate that they expect will win.

Legal definitions

In the American Sector of Allied-occupied Germany, a "follower" was the second lowest group or category in the denazification proceedings. The denazification hearings classified Germans according to five groups:

 1. Major Offenders
 2. Offenders: Activists, Militants, or Profiteers
 3. Lesser offenders
 4. Followers
 5. Exonerated persons

Assessment
Of the five categories  is the most controversial as it does not relate to any formal Nazi criminal activity, as defined by the Nuremberg trials, only to a loosely defined indirect support of Nazi crimes. Therefore, former German Chancellor Helmut Schmidt could say about Herbert von Karajan's Nazi Party membership card: "Karajan was obviously not a Nazi.

In essence  were found de facto guilty of contributing to Nazi crimes, even though they were not necessarily ideologically committed to some essential Nazi doctrines, especially biological racism and the policy of Jewish extermination.

The Nazi  often were of a slightly different sort: they sympathised with the Nazis but only indirectly participated in Nazi atrocities such as genocide. This is why this category was often used as an easy way to excuse most Germans legally from Nazi crimes.

Examples

See also
 Bandwagon effect
 Herd behavior
 List of Axis personnel indicted for war crimes
 The Holocaust
 Fellow traveller

References

External links
 The  in Two German Postwar Films

German words and phrases